Bubul Das is an Asom Gana Parishad politician from Assam. He has been elected in Assam Legislative Assembly election in 1996 to 2006 from Jagiroad constituency.

References 

Living people
Asom Gana Parishad politicians
People from Morigaon district
Assam MLAs 1991–1996
Assam MLAs 1996–2001
Assam MLAs 2001–2006
Year of birth missing (living people)